

Verran is a locality in the Australian state of South Australia located on the Eyre Peninsula about  west of the state capital of  Adelaide. Its name is derived from the cadastral unit of the Hundred of Verran, which was named for former Premier John Verran.

Verran began as a government town surveyed during May 1914 and proclaimed by Governor Galway on 30 July 1914.  The government town was declared to “cease to exist” on 29 October 1970.  Boundaries for the locality were created during December 1998 and include the “ceased Government Town of Verran.”

The Verran Siding School opened in 1913 and closed in 1941. A postal receiving office opened at Verran on 21 June 1912, became a post office in June 1915, and closed on 29 February 1972.

The principal land use within the locality is ‘primary production’ which mainly concerned with "grazing and cropping."  It also includes the protected area known as the Verran Tanks Conservation Park.

The 2016 Australian census which was conducted in August 2016 reports that Verran had 88 people living within its boundaries.

Verran is located within the federal division of Grey, the state electoral district of Flinders and the local government area of the District Council of Cleve.

References

Eyre Peninsula
Towns in South Australia